LWW may refer to:

The Lion, the Witch and the Wardrobe, a fantasy novel by C.S. Lewis
Lippincott Williams & Wilkins, an academic and professional medical publisher
Lincoln-Way West High School, a high school in New Lenox, Illinois